The 2020 Marbella Tennis Open was a professional tennis tournament played on clay courts. It was the third edition of the tournament which was part of the 2020 ATP Challenger Tour. It took place in Marbella, Spain between 26 October and 1 November 2020.

Singles main-draw entrants

Seeds

 1 Rankings are as of 19 October 2020.

Other entrants
The following players received wildcards into the singles main draw:
  Carlos Gómez-Herrera
  Nicola Kuhn
  Holger Vitus Nødskov Rune

The following players received entry into the singles main draw using a protected ranking:
  Tommy Robredo

The following players received entry into the singles main draw as alternates:
  Elliot Benchetrit
  Alexandre Müller

The following players received entry from the qualifying draw:
  Riccardo Bonadio
  Carlos Gimeno Valero
  Vít Kopřiva
  Andrea Pellegrino

Champions

Singles

  Pedro Martínez def.  Jaume Munar 7–6(7–4), 6–2.

Doubles

 Gerard Granollers /  Pedro Martínez def.  Luis David Martínez /  Fernando Romboli 6–3, 6–4.

References

2020 ATP Challenger Tour
2020 in Spanish tennis
October 2020 sports events in Spain
November 2020 sports events in Spain